In mathematical analysis, Lambert summation is a summability method for a class of divergent series.

Definition
A series  is Lambert summable to A, written , if

If a series is convergent to A then it is Lambert summable to A (an Abelian theorem).

Examples

 , where μ is the Möbius function.  Hence if this series converges at all, it converges to zero.

See also
 Lambert series
 Abel–Plana formula
 Abelian and tauberian theorems

References
 

Mathematical series
Summability methods